HCAP may refer to:

 HC Ambri-Piotta, a Swiss ice hockey club
 Healthcare-associated pneumonia
 human cathelicidin antimicrobial protein
 The Honourable Company of Air Pilots, formerly the Guild of Air Pilots and Air Navigators, a London livery company
 Host Credential Authorization Protocol, a component of Microsoft Network Policy Server
 Hitachi Community Action Partnership, a program of The Hitachi Foundation

See also